Venusian , Venerean , or Venereal may refer to:

 Venus, a planet
 Venusians, hypothetical or fictional beings that inhabit the planet Venus
According to the book Women are from Venus, a Venusian is a woman
 Venus (goddess)

See also 
 Cytherean, for a discussion of adjectives relating to the planet Venus
 Venus (disambiguation)

Venus